Utica is a unincorporated community in west-central Judith Basin County, Montana, United States. Yogo sapphires were found near Utica in the mid-1890s.

Judith River Ranger Station is near town.  The town itself now consists only of a church and a museum, plus a few houses.

Demographics

Notable residents

One of Utica's most famous local residents was the western painter C.M. Russell, who at the time was a young cowhand hired by a local rancher and gold miner named Jake Hoover. Russell stated that he learned most of his frontier skills from Hoover, and the two men remained lifelong friends. He featured Utica in the 1907 painting A Quiet Day In Utica, which was originally known as Tinning a Dog. Hoover; local businesswoman Mollie Ringold, a former slave; store owner Charles Lehman and Russell himself are all depicted in the painting, seen standing between the hitching post and door of the general store.

Notes

External links
 Utica Museum

Unincorporated communities in Judith Basin County, Montana
Unincorporated communities in Montana